Myron L. Gordon (February 11, 1918 – November 3, 2009) was a United States district judge of the United States District Court for the Eastern District of Wisconsin.

Education and career

Born in Kenosha, Wisconsin, Gordon received a Bachelor of Arts degree from the University of Wisconsin in 1939 and a Master of Arts degree from the same institution in 1939. He received a Bachelor of Laws from Harvard Law School in 1942. He was Lieutenant in the United States Naval Reserve from 1944 to 1946. He was in private practice in Milwaukee, Wisconsin from 1945 to 1950. He was a civil court judge in Milwaukee County from 1950 to 1954. He was a circuit court judge for the State of Wisconsin from 1954 to 1961. He was elected to the Wisconsin Supreme Court in 1861 and served until his federal appointment in 1967.

Federal judicial service

Gordon was nominated by President Lyndon B. Johnson on January 16, 1967, to the United States District Court for the Eastern District of Wisconsin, to a new seat created by 80 Stat. 75. He was confirmed by the United States Senate on March 2, 1967, and received his commission on March 4, 1967. He assumed senior status on February 12, 1983. He served in that status until his death on November 3, 2009, in Palm Desert, California.

References

Sources
 

1918 births
2009 deaths
University of Wisconsin–Madison alumni
Harvard Law School alumni
Judges of the United States District Court for the Eastern District of Wisconsin
United States district court judges appointed by Lyndon B. Johnson
20th-century American judges
Politicians from Kenosha, Wisconsin
Justices of the Wisconsin Supreme Court
Wisconsin state court judges
United States Navy officers
Military personnel from Wisconsin
United States Navy reservists
United States Navy personnel of World War II